Sumy-Tovarna (Sumy-Freight, Ukrainian: Суми-Товарна) is a railway station and major freight station in Sumy, Sumy Oblast, Ukraine. The station is on the Sumy Directorate of Southern Railways on the Bilopillya-Basy line. The station is the main station for freight loading and unloading for the city of Sumy.

Sumy-Tovarna is located in the Vasylivka neighborhood of Sumy, in between the city's main station ( away) and Basy station ( away).

Passenger service

Both passenger and suburban trains stop at Sumy-Tovarna station.

Notes

 Tariff Guide No. 4. Book 1 (as of 05/15/2021) (Russian) Archived 05/15/2021.
 Arkhangelsky A.S., Arkhangelsky V.A. in two books. - M.: Transport, 1981. (rus.)

References

External Links

Sumy-Tovarna on railwayz.info
Passenger train schedule
Suburban train schedule

Railway stations in Sumy Oblast
Sumy
Buildings and structures in Sumy Oblast
Railway stations opened in 1978